Deyda Hydara (June 9, 1946 – December 16, 2004) was a co-founder and primary editor of The Point, a major independent Gambian newspaper. He was also a correspondent for both AFP News Agency and Reporters Without Borders for more than 30 years. Hydara also worked as a Radio presenter in the Gambia called Radio Syd during his early years as a freelance journalist.

Journalism with The Point
On December 16, 1991, Hydara co-founded The Point along with Pap Saine and Babucarr Gaye; Saine and Hydara had been friends since childhood. Gaye resigned four months later, and Hydara and Saine ran the paper together for the next decade.

Murder
Hydara was an advocate of press freedom and a fierce critic of the government of then President Yahya Jammeh, who was openly hostile to Gambian journalists and the media. On December 14, 2004, the Gambia passed two new media laws. One, the Criminal Code (Amendment) Bill 2004, allowed prison terms for defamation and sedition; the other, the Newspaper (Amendment) Bill 2004, required newspaper owners to purchase expensive operating licenses, registering their homes as security. Hydara announced his intent to challenge these laws, but on December 16, was assassinated by an unknown gunman while driving home from work in Banjul. Two of his colleagues were also injured. Over the years, the Gambian government was the target of much criticism for its failure to properly field an investigation and also for intimidating those who made such criticisms. Hydara's family filed a lawsuit against the government for negligence, and an ECOWAS court ruled in favour of the family in 2014, awarding them $60,000 in damages and legal fees, although the government has not yet complied with the ruling. His murder remains unsolved, although in May 2017 (after Adama Barrow replaced Yahya Jammeh as President), arrest warrants were issued for two army officers as suspects.

Deyda Hydara was survived by his wife and his five children. He was posthumously awarded the PEN/Barbara Goldsmith Freedom to Write Award in 2005 In 2010, he won the Hero of African Journalism Award of The African Editors’ Forum in 2010, sharing the latter with disappeared journalist Ebrima Manneh.

In testimony of Lt Malick Jatta before the Truth, Reconciliation and Reparations Commission, TRRC, at a public hearing in Banjul on July 22, 2019 Jatta said that Hydara was shot on the orders of Jammeh.

Investigation controversy and defamation trial
In November 2008, the International Press Institute began a "Justice Denied" campaign pressing for investigations into violence against journalists in the Gambia, particularly the still-unsolved murder of Deyda Haydara. At a June 2009 press conference, Gambian President Yahya Jammeh disparaged questions about the Hydara investigation, saying "And up to now one of these stupid Web sites carries 'Who Killed Deyda Hydara'?  Let them go and ask Deyda Hydara who killed him." Although the killers have not yet been brought to justice, it is believed by some that the former government in the Republic of Gambia may have been responsible for this act. The Gambia Press Union then published a statement criticizing the lack of press freedom in Gambia, the stalled progress of the investigation, and the president's remarks, which the union called  "inappropriate".
 The statement ran in The Point and a weekly newspaper, Foroyaa, on June 11.

The Gambian government responded by arresting six journalists: Pap Saine, News Editor Ebrima Sawaneh, and reporters Sarata Jabbi-Dibba and Pa Modou Faal of The Point; and editor Sam Saar and reporters Emil Touray of Foroyaa. The six were charged with sedition and criminal defamation of the president. Jabbi-Dibba (the only woman) was held in Mile 2 prison, while Saine, Sawaneh, Faal, Saar, and Touray were held in Old Jeshwang prison. On August 8, Jabbi-Dibba's seven-month-old baby was taken away.

Numerous human rights NGOs protested the arrests and called the charges against the journalists to be dropped. Amnesty International designated the six as prisoners of conscience and demanded their immediate release. The Committee to Protect Journalists also campaigned for Saine's release, as did the World Organization Against Torture, the International Federation for Human Rights, International PEN, the PEN American Center, and Front Line Defenders. Jammeh continued to denounce the journalists, however, making a state television appearance to say "So they think they can hide behind so-called press freedom and violate the law and get away with it? They got it wrong this time ... We are going to prosecute them to the letter."

On August 7, 2009, the six were convicted and sentenced to two years' imprisonment in Mile 2 Prison, as well as a fine of 250,000 dalasi (£5,780) apiece. However, Jammeh pardoned them in September, following a campaign of "domestic and international pressure". The pardons were issued to coincide with Ramadan.

In June 2014, a decade after his assassination, the ECOWAS Community Court of Justice found the Gambian government liable for failing to diligently investigate Deyda Hydara’s murder. The Nigerian law firm, Aluko & Oyebode, represented the family of Deyda Hydara and the Africa Regional Office of the International Federation of Journalists (IFJ-Africa) in the law suit against the Gambian government.

See also
List of unsolved murders

References

1946 births
2004 deaths
20th-century journalists
Agence France-Presse journalists
Assassinated Gambian journalists
Deaths by firearm in the Gambia
Male murder victims
People murdered in the Gambia
Unsolved murders in the Gambia